Giuseppe Makes a Movie is a 2014 documentary film created by Adam Rifkin about the micro-budget films of actor/director Giuseppe Andrews.

References

External links
 
 

2014 films
American documentary films
Documentary films about film directors and producers
2010s English-language films
2010s American films